FK Jēkabpils/JSC is a Latvian football club based in Jēkabpils.

History
From 2008 season the club played in the second-highest division of Latvian football (1. līga) and the Latvian Football Cup.

On 14 July 2017 Latvian football federation informed, that In the championship of Latvia on football three more teams are disqualified. The disciplinary commission of the Football Federation of Latvia for the influence on the results of matches excluded two teams from the first league ("Jekabpils" and "Ogre") and one second league team (Riga "FC Raita") for an indefinite period from the national football championship.

First-team squad
As of 24 April 2017.

References

Football clubs in Latvia